Tapes is a genus of bivalves belonging to the subfamily Tapetinae of the family Veneridae.

Species
 Tapes albomarginata Preston, 1908
 Tapes araneosus (Philippi, 1847)
 Tapes belcheri G. B. Sowerby II, 1852
 Tapes conspersus (Gmelin, 1791)
 Tapes literatus (Linnaeus, 1758)
 Tapes ngocae Thach, 2016
 † Tapes parki (P. Marshall & Murdoch, 1923) 
 Tapes platyptycha Pilsbry, 1901
 Tapes sericeus Matsukuma, 1986
 † Tapes siratoriensis (Otuka, 1934) 
 Tapes sulcarius (Lamarck, 1818)

References

 Otuka Y. (1937). The geological age of the Tertiary formation near Hamada, Simane Prefecture, Japan. Japanese Journal of Geology and Geography. 14(1-2): 23-32.
 Vaught, K.C.; Abbott, R.T.; Boss, K.J. (1989). A classification of the living Mollusca. American Malacologists: Melbourne. ISBN 0-915826-22-4. XII, 195 pp

External links
 Megerle von Mühlfeld J.C. (1811). Entwurf eines neuen Systems der Schaltiergehäuse. Magazin für die neuesten Entdecklungen in der gesammten Naturkunde von der Gesellschaft Naturforschaft Freunde zu Berlin. 5(1): 38-72, plate 3
 Römer E. (1857). Kritische Untersuchung der Arten des Mollusken-Geschlechts Venus bei Linné und Gmelin, mit Berücksichtigung der später beschriebenen Arten. Marburg. xiii + 135 p.
 Römer E. (1857). Kritische Untersuchung der Arten des Mollusken-Geschlechts Venus bei Linné und Gmelin, mit Berücksichtigung der später beschriebenen Arten. Marburg. xiii + 135 p
 Gofas, S.; Le Renard, J.; Bouchet, P. (2001). Mollusca. in: Costello, M.J. et al. (eds), European Register of Marine Species: a check-list of the marine species in Europe and a bibliography of guides to their identification. Patrimoines Naturels. 50: 180-213

Veneridae
Bivalve genera